Md. Shahjahan is a Bangladesh Nationalist Party politician and the former member of parliament for Noakhali-4.

Career
Shahjahan was elected to Parliament from Noakhali-4 as a Bangladesh Nationalist Party candidate in 2001. He was arrested on 8 March 2015 by Rapid Action Battalion for being involved in a conspiracy against the Bangladeshi government. In November 2015, he was tasked with nominating Bangladesh Nationalist Party candidates for municipal elections. He is a vice-chairman of Bangladesh Nationalist Party. In 2016, he resigned from his post of presidency of the Noakhali District unit of Bangladesh Nationalist Party.

References

Bangladesh Nationalist Party politicians
Living people
8th Jatiya Sangsad members
5th Jatiya Sangsad members
6th Jatiya Sangsad members
7th Jatiya Sangsad members
Year of birth missing (living people)